This is a list of justices of the Connecticut Supreme Court.

Connecticut Supreme Court justices

Supreme Court of Errors (1784–1807)

Connecticut Supreme Court (after 1807)

References

External links
 

Connecticut
Justices